Sukharevskaya is a station on the Kaluzhsko-Rizhskaya line of the Moscow Metro. It opened on 5 January 1972. The station's underground vestibule is located under Sretenka Street just south of the Garden Ring. From its opening until November 1990, the station was called Kolkhoznaya, as a nod to the collective farming of the Soviet Union and the similarly named square. As Soviet names lost favor, the square was renamed into the Large and Small Sukharev Squares, both of which are named for the Sukharev Tower, which stood nearby until 1934. The station was renamed Sukharevskaya, accordingly.

Design
The yellowish marble pylons resemble stylized sheaves of wheat in keeping with the station's original name, Kolkhoznaya or "Collective Farm." The walls are faced with white marble and decorated with plaques by R. Pogrebnoy (who was also the architect), Ye. Kolyupanova, and S. Kolyupanov. Lighting comes from rows of inset lamps running along the base of the ceiling.

Gallery

References

Moscow Metro stations
Railway stations in Russia opened in 1972
Kaluzhsko-Rizhskaya Line
1972 establishments in the Soviet Union
Railway stations located underground in Russia